Leptoseps osellai, known as Osella's skink, is a species of skink found in Thailand.

Etymology
The specific name osellai is in honor of Italian entomologist Giuseppe Osella.

References

Leptoseps
Reptiles described in 1981
Taxa named by Wolfgang Böhme (herpetologist)